Obtortionidae is a family of sea snails, marine gastropod molluscs in the superfamily 	Cerithioidea, that is within the clade Cerithimorpha or in clade Sorbeoconcha.

The shell of the larva is ornamental.

2005 taxonomy 
According to the taxonomy of the Gastropoda by Bouchet & Rocroi (2005) the family Obtortionidae has been recognized as a synonym of family Scaliolidae within clade Caenogastropoda/clade Sorbeoconcha/Superfamily Cerithioidea. Finellidae has been also a synonym of Scaliolidae.

2006 taxonomy 
Bandel (2006) have classified Obtortionidae in superfamily Cerithioidea within clade Cerithimorpha in the order Palaeo-Caenogastropoda Bandel, 1993 within subclass Caenogastropoda.

Genera 
Genera within the family Obtortionidae include:
 Obtortio Hedley, 1899
 Clathrofenella Kuroda & Habe, 1952
 Finella Adams, 1860 is in subfamily Finellinae within Bittiidae per Bandel (2006) but it used to be classified in Obtortionidae also (WoRMS 2009).

Footnotes

References